Win Thein (ဝင်းသိန်း; b. ) is an engineer and the former chief minister of Bago Region, appointed by president Htin Kyaw in 2016.

Early life and education 
Win Thein graduated with a bachelor's in mechanical engineering and an AGTI diploma. Before becoming a politician for Yedashe Township, he worked as a farmer.

Career 
Win Thein was appointed as Chief Minister of Bago Region on 30 March 2016 by President Htin Kyaw. In October 2019, he apologized for controversial remarks encouraging villagers to marry schoolteachers to retain them in the countryside. In the wake of the 2021 Myanmar coup d'état on 1 February, he was detained by the Myanmar Armed Forces.

References 

Living people
Government ministers of Myanmar
Year of birth missing (living people)